Páll Jónsson (1155 – November 29, 1211;;) was an Icelandic Roman Catholic clergyman, who became the seventh bishop of Iceland from 1195 to 1211. He served in the diocese of Skálholt. His life is recorded in Páls saga biskups.

Páll was a descendant of the Oddaverjar family clan.

He is known as a patron of the celebrated artist Margret him haga (Margaret the Dextrous).

References

See also
List of Skálholt bishops

12th-century Roman Catholic bishops in Iceland
13th-century Roman Catholic bishops in Iceland
1155 births
1211 deaths
Married Roman Catholic bishops
12th-century Icelandic people
13th-century Icelandic people